Going for a Song is a British game show that originally aired on BBC1 from 6 October 1965 to 16 October 1977 and hosted by Max Robertson, with Arthur Negus appearing as the resident expert and antique valuer. It was revived on the same channel from 29 August 1995 to 3 February 2002, the revival was first hosted by Michael Parkinson from 1995 to 1999, then hosted by Anne Robinson in 2000 and finally hosted by Michael Aspel from 2001 to 2002, with Eric Knowles as the resident antiques expert for the entire run of the revival.

Format
The host would introduce an antique to a panel of antique experts, valuers and celebrity panellists who would examine the object and give its date and value. The antiques expert would then present its actual age and worth. Midway through the show, the host would also present a piece of furniture which he would give detailed information about; this was done to effectively break the show into two segments and allow the panelists to relax and listen midway through the show.

References

External links
 
 
 

1965 British television series debuts
2002 British television series endings
1960s British game shows
1970s British game shows
1990s British game shows
2000s British game shows
Antiques television series
BBC television game shows
British television series revived after cancellation
English-language television shows
Television series by All3Media